Vichara Dany stars in her debut film Picheyvongsa and in three years, 1970, she would become the lead actress for 90%& of Khmer films released every year. Of the 20 films listed, 7 films  are in existence, 5 have been remade including the 2 versions of Neang Keo Nama, and 8 have not yet been remade, :

References 
 

1967
Films
Cambodian